= Romance comics (disambiguation) =

Romance comics may refer to:

- Romance comics in the United States (1946–1975), a type of comics with romantic themes that was popular in the U.S.
- Romantic comics which involve romantic stories, recently popular in Japanese manga and anime series
